The Galula Formation is a geological formation located south of Lake Rukwa in Tanzania, part of the Red Sandstone Group of the Rukwa Rift Basin. Along with the unconformably overlying Oligocene Nsungwe Formation. It is divided into two members, the lower Mtuka Member and the upper Namba Member.

The age of the deposit is poorly constrained, with the Mtuka Member likely being Aptian to Cenomanian in age, while the Namba Member being Cenomanian to Campanian in age based on Geomagnetic reversals. It is correlated with the Dinosaur Beds of Malawi.

The formation is fossiliferous, with Dinosaurs and Crocodyliformes being known from the formation.

Geology

Lithology 
The Lithology of the formation is a sequence of red, pink, purple and occasionally white colored sandstones, conglomerates and mudstones. The Mtuka member is 160–180 m thick in the type section, and is typified by coarser sandstone, a higher frequency of conglomerates, higher proportions of extraformational clasts, thicker and a greater frequency of overbank siltstone and mudstone lenses and a higher proportion of paleosols. While the Namba member is between 340–360 m in the type section, and is less variable in facies, predominated by very fine-to medium-grained sandstones with less overbank mudstone and siltstone lenses.

Vertebrate paleofauna

Fish

Crocodyliformes

Dinosaurs

Turtles

Mammals

References 

Geologic formations of Tanzania
Albian Stage
Aptian Stage
Lower Cretaceous Series of Africa
Cenomanian Stage
Turonian Stage
Coniacian Stage
Santonian Stage
Campanian Stage
Upper Cretaceous Series of Africa
Cretaceous Tanzania
Sandstone formations
Fluvial deposits
Paleontology in Tanzania